"Heart Wants What It Wants" is a song by American singer and songwriter Bebe Rexha from her upcoming third studio album Bebe. The song was released as the lead single from the album for digital download and streaming in various countries by Warner on February 17, 2023.

Background and composition 

"Heart Wants What It Wants" was released for digital download and streaming in various countries by Warner on February 17, 2023, as the lead single from Rexha's upcoming third studio album. The song was penned by Rexha, Bonnie McKee, Ido Zmishlany, Jussi Karvinen, Liana Banks, Ray Goren, Ryan Williamson and Sarah Solovay, with the production completed by Zmishlany. Musically, it is a 1970s-inspired disco and pop song. The song is about "the time in relationships where you fall out of love with your partner".

Music video 

To accompany the release, a music video for "Heart Wants What It Wants" premiered to Rexha's official YouTube channel on February 17, 2023.

Charts

Release history

References 

2023 singles
2023 songs
Bebe Rexha songs
Warner Records singles
Songs written by Bebe Rexha
Songs written by Bonnie McKee